Negarabad (also Romanized as Negārābād; also known as Nayyerābād and Niyārābād) is a village in Shirin Su Rural District, Shirin Su District, Kabudarahang County, Hamadan Province, Iran. At the 2006 census, its population was 667, in 135 families.

References 

Populated places in Kabudarahang County